Loren Jenkins (born 1938) is a war correspondent for the Washington Post who won a 1983 Pulitzer Prize for International Reporting "for reporting of the Israeli invasion of Beirut and its tragic aftermath".

Biography
Loren Jenkins was born in New Orleans into a family of American Foreign Service employees. He earned a bachelor's degree from the University of Colorado in Boulder at the end of the 1950s and then stinted with the Peace Corps in Puerto Rico and Sierra Leone. Jenkins returned to Aspen in 1964, where he worked as a ski instructor. He later continued his studies at Aspen University and did his graduate work at Columbia University in New York.

Jenkins got his first position as a reporter in 1964 with the Daily Item. After leaving the newspaper in 1965, he worked for United Press International as an overseas correspondent in  New York, London, Rome, and Madrid. In 1969–1979, Jenkins served in Newsweek to cover Black September, the Suez Crisis, and the Vietnam war. Correspondent's articles for Newsweek was honored with the Overseas Press Club Award in 1976.

In 1980, Jenkins joined the Washington Post staff. During his tenure with the newspaper, he was awarded the Pulitzer Prize for International Reporting in 1983 for his coverage of the Israeli invasion of Lebanon. At that time, the Washington Post was criticized for bias in covering the Israel–United States conflict. For example, Marty Peretz described Jenkins as «anti-Israel» and inane declared that the journalist won a Pulitzer Prize because most of the judges subscribed to the Washington Post–Los Angeles Times news service.

In 1990, Jenkins returned to Colorado, where he got the editor position at the Aspen Times. In 1995, he was named an editor of the international desk at National Public Radio, where he worked for the next fifteen years. Under Jenkins's leadership, correspondents of the radio station covered the wars in Kosovo, Chechnya, Iraq, and Afghanistan. In 2005  the international desk at NPR was awarded the George Peabody Award. In November 2011, Loren Jenkins retired but continued to write as a freelancer.

References

Books

1938 births
American expatriates in Sierra Leone
Pulitzer Prize for International Reporting winners
People from New Orleans
University of Colorado Boulder alumni
Newsweek people
The Washington Post journalists
Living people